Argo Golberg (born 16 December 1982) is an Estonian sprinter.

He was born in Põlva. In 2001 he graduated from Audentes Sport Gymnasium.

He started his athletics career exercising in Põlva under the guidance of Sulev Arundi. Later his coach was Valter Espe. In 2003 he won a silver medal at the 2003 European Athletics U23 Championships. He is 7-times Estonian champion (between 2001–2006).

Records:
 100 m: 10,28 (also Estonian national record) 
 60 m: 6,71 
 200 m 21,44 (2002)

References

External links

Living people
1982 births
Estonian male sprinters
People from Põlva